USS Tempest was a 161-ton steamer acquired  by the Union Navy during the American Civil War for service against the Confederate States of America.

Tempest was commissioned as a gunboat at the end of the war and was assigned demobilization operations in western waters of the Confederacy.

Built at Louisville, Kentucky, in 1862 

Tempest—a wooden-hulled, sidewheel steamer built in 1862 at Louisville, Kentucky—was acquired by the Navy at Cincinnati, Ohio, on 30 December 1864 from Joseph Brown; was converted there to a gunboat by Mr. Brown; and was commissioned on 26 April, Acting Volunteer Lt. Comdr. William G. Saltonstall in command.

Civil War-related operations 

Tempest operated with the naval forces in western waters throughout her brief naval career. She served as flagship for Acting Rear Admiral Samuel Phillips Lee, while he directed efforts on the Mississippi River and its tributaries to prevent the escape of the former President of the Confederacy, Jefferson Davis.

She continued in this role while he oversaw the demobilization of the Mississippi Squadron. Rear Admiral Lee hauled down his flag from her on 14 August.

Post-war decommissioning 

The ship was decommissioned at Mound City, Illinois, on 30 November 1865, the day after she was sold at public auction there to Robert Cams. Tempest was redocumented on 11 December 1865 and remained in merchant service until 1870.

See also

Anaconda Plan

References 

Ships of the Union Navy
Ships built in Kentucky
Steamships of the United States Navy
Gunboats of the United States Navy
American Civil War patrol vessels of the United States
1862 ships